Thomas Straw (1 September 1870 – 8 September 1959) was an English first-class cricketer. A right-handed batsman born in Hucknall Torkard, Nottinghamshire, he kept wicket for Worcestershire County Cricket Club in their early years of first-class cricket. He was a poor batsman, with a top score of just 32 in his 94 innings, and went in at or near the bottom of the order.

Straw made his debut on 4 May 1899 in Worcestershire's very first first-class match, against Yorkshire at New Road. He batted at number 11, making 9 and nought, and claimed no victims in Yorkshire's first innings, although he did get off the mark in the second with a notable scalp when he held a catch to dismiss David Denton off the bowling of George Wilson.

In his 13 matches during the 1899 season, Straw held 29 catches and made one stumping, the latter against Oxford University. For the next two seasons he remained an integral part of the Worcestershire side, claiming a total of 90 dismissals in those two summers; however, he was replaced by George Gaukrodger for the 1902 season. Straw returned to the side for a single game against Oxford University in 1903, but was otherwise absent from the team for several years.

In May 1907, he made a return to the Worcestershire side against Hampshire, although only 58 overs of play were possible in the game and he did not get a mention on the scorecard. Later that same year, in August, he played four more matches, the last of these against Surrey at New Road. Straw's final victim in first-class cricket was Jack Hobbs, caught for 2 off the bowling of John Cuffe.

In the whole history of first-class cricket (prior to 2012) there have been only 23 instances of a batsman being dismissed for obstructing the field, but it happened to Straw on two occasions, in 1899 and 1901, both times against Warwickshire.

Straw died in the place of his birth a week after his 89th birthday.

References

External links
 
 

1870 births
1959 deaths
People from Hucknall
Cricketers from Nottinghamshire
English cricketers
Worcestershire cricketers
Wicket-keepers